The "Corvida" were one of two "parvorders" contained within the suborder Passeri, as proposed in the Sibley-Ahlquist taxonomy, the other being Passerida. Standard taxonomic practice would place them at the rank of infraorder.

More recent research suggests that this is not a distinct clade—a group of closest relatives and nothing else—but an evolutionary grade instead. As such, it is abandoned in modern treatments, being replaced by a number of superfamilies that are considered rather basal among the Passeri.

It was presumed that cooperative breeding—present in many or most members of the Maluridae, Meliphagidae, Artamidae and Corvidae, among others—is a common apomorphy of this group. But as evidenced by the updated phylogeny, this trait is rather the result of parallel evolution, perhaps because the early Passeri had to compete against many ecologically similar birds (see near passerine).

Placement of "Corvida" families
This table lists, in taxonomic order, the families placed in "Corvida" by the Sibley-Ahlquist taxonomy in the left column. The right column contains details of their placement in modern systematics.

Corvoidea and Meliphagoidea are placed basally among the Passeri too. They are, however, groups large enough to be considered superfamilies in their own right.

In addition, the following families were not included in the "Corvida" although their closest relationships are with taxa included therein:

Footnotes

References 

  (1996): Why do so many Australian birds cooperate? Social evolution in the Corvida. In: : Frontiers in Population Ecology: 21–42. CSIRO, Melbourne.

 
Obsolete bird taxa
Paraphyletic groups